Maple Grove is an unincorporated community in Clallam County, Washington, United States. Maple Grove is assigned the ZIP code 98363.

Maple Grove is on the Lake Sutherland U.S. Geological Survey Map.

References

Unincorporated communities in Clallam County, Washington
Unincorporated communities in Washington (state)